Damn Damn Leash is Be Your Own Pet's first EP. It was released in 2004 in the United States and in 2005 in Europe and Japan.

Track listing

Personnel

Jemina Pearl – Vocals
Jonas Stein – Guitar
Nathan Vasquez – Bass
Jamin Orrall – Drums
Jimmy Abegg – Photography
Jim DeMain – Mastering
Hollis Flatt – Mastering
Capers Flen – Engineer, Mixing
Jacquire King – Producer, Mixing
Roger Moutenot – Engineer
Robert Ellis Orrall – Producer

References

2004 debut EPs
Be Your Own Pet albums
XL Recordings EPs
Albums produced by Jacquire King